David Dennison may refer to:

 David Dennison (cricketer) (born 1961), Irish cricketer
 David Dennison (pseudonym), one of three notable pseudonyms of Donald Trump
 David M. Dennison (1900–1976), American physicist
 David S. Dennison Jr. (1918–2001), American politician in the US House of Representatives